Joy Fielding (née Tepperman; born March 18, 1945) is a Canadian novelist and actress. She lives in Toronto, Ontario.

Biography
Born in Toronto, Ontario, she graduated from the University of Toronto in 1966, with a Bachelor of Arts in English Literature. As Joy Tepperman, she had a brief acting career, appearing in the film Winter Kept Us Warm (1965) and in an episode of Gunsmoke. She later changed her last name to Fielding (after Henry Fielding) and began writing novels.

Fielding is also the screenwriter of the television film Golden Will: The Silken Laumann Story.

In the 1980s, she was also a regular contributor of book reviews to Jack Farr's CBC Radio program The Radio Show.

Personal
At the age of 8, Tepperman wrote her first story and sent it into a local magazine, and at age 12 sent in her first TV script, however both were rejected. She had a brief acting career, eventually giving it up to write full-time in 1972.  She has published 30 novels and 1 Novella (as of September 2022), two of which were converted into film. Fielding's process of having an idea to the point the novel is finished generally takes a year, the writing itself taking four to eight months.

Fielding sets most of her novels in American cities such as Boston and Chicago. She has said that she prefers to set her novels in "big American cities, [as the] landscape seems best for [her] themes of urban alienation and loss of identity."

Fielding is a Canadian citizen. Her husband is noted Toronto attorney, Warren Seyffert. They have two daughters, Annie and Shannon,  and own property in Toronto, Ontario, as well as Palm Beach, Florida.

Interview
Fielding had an interview with the Vancouver Sun in 2007, just after her publication of Heartstopper. She enjoys catching readers off guard with the endings of her stories, but insists that it "isn't what her fiction is about", but rather more about the development of her characters.

Discussing her novels with the Toronto Star in 2008, she said "I might not write fiction in the literary sense.  But I write very well.  My characters are good. My dialog is good. And my stories are really involving. I'm writing exactly the kind of books I like to write.  And they're the kind of books I like to read. They're popular commercial fiction. That's what they are."

Audience

Fielding has been noted as a novelist who is more popular in the United States and foreign countries, rather than in her native Canada. For example, the novel Kiss Mommy Goodbye was more popular in the States, and See Jane Run in Germany. In addition, she had an American agent and publisher, although she has now switched to a Canadian publisher.

Bibliography

The Best of Friends (1972) – Novel
The Transformation (1976) – Novel
Trance (1979) – Novel
Kiss Mommy Goodbye (1981) – Novel
The Other Woman (1983) – Novel
Life Penalty (1984) – Novel
The Deep End (1986) – Novel
Good Intentions (1989) – Novel
See Jane Run (1991) – Novel
Tell Me No Secrets (1993) – Novel
Don't Cry Now (1995) – Novel
Missing Pieces (1997) – Novel
The First Time (2000) – Novel
Grand Avenue (2001) – Novel
Whispers and Lies (2002) – Novel
Lost (2003) – Novel
Puppet (2005) – Novel
Mad River Road (2006) – Novel
Heartstopper (2007) – Novel
Charley's Web (2008) – Novel
Still Life (2009) – Novel
The Wild Zone (2010) – Novel
Home Invasion (2011) – Novella
Now You See Her (2011) – Novel
Shadow Creek (2012) – Novel
Someone Is Watching (2015) – Novel
She's Not There (2016) – Novel
The Bad Daughter (2018) – Novel
All The Wrong Places (2019) – Novel
Cul-de-sac (2021) – Novel
The Housekeeper (2022) – Novel

References

External links
Official homepage

1945 births
Living people
20th-century Canadian novelists
21st-century Canadian novelists
Canadian women screenwriters
University of Toronto alumni
Canadian women novelists
Canadian film actresses
Actresses from Toronto
Writers from Toronto
20th-century Canadian women writers
21st-century Canadian women writers
Canadian thriller writers
20th-century Canadian screenwriters